Bradley Page (September 8, 1901 – December 8, 1985) was an American film actor. He appeared in more than 100 films between 1931 and 1943.

Selected filmography

 Sporting Blood (1931) - Eddie Frazier (uncredited)
 X Marks the Spot (1931) - District Attorney Harry B. Miles (uncredited)
 The Final Edition (1932) - Sid Malvern
 Love Affair (1932) - Georgie Keeler
 The Wet Parade (1932) - Frankie - Bootlegger (uncredited)
 Attorney for the Defense (1932) - Nick Quinn
 They Call It Sin (1932) - Ford's Nightclub Friend (uncredited)
 Night After Night (1932) - Frankie Guard
 Sundown Rider (1932) - Jim Hunter
 Goldie Gets Along (1933) - Frank Hawthorne
 From Hell to Heaven (1933) - Jack Ruby
 Love Is Dangerous (1933) - Dean Scarsdale
 Central Airport (1933) - Scotty Armstrong (uncredited)
 Hell Below (1933) - Seaman Gardner (uncredited)
 Song of the Eagle (1933) - Los Angeles Racket Boss (uncredited)
 The Life of Jimmy Dolan (1933) - One of Dolan's Backers (uncredited)
 This Day and Age (1933) - Toledo
 Stage Mother (1933) - Tom Banton (uncredited)
 Broken Dreams (1933) - Minor Role (uncredited)
 Hold the Press (1933) - Mike Serrano
 The Chief (1933) - Dapper Dan
 From Headquarters (1933) - Reporter (uncredited)
 Blood Money (1933) - District Attorney (uncredited)
 Before Midnight (1933) - Howard B. Smith
 East of Fifth Avenue (1933) - Nick
 Shadows of Sing Sing (1933) - Slick Hale
 Search for Beauty (1934) - Joe Garrett
 Six of a Kind (1934) - Ferguson
 The Fighting Ranger (1934) - The Cougar
 Good Dame (1934) - Regan
 Looking for Trouble (1934) - George Martin, Associate (uncredited)
 The Crime of Helen Stanley (1934) - George T. Noel
 I Hate Women (1934) - Powell
 He Was Her Man (1934) - Dan 'Danny' Curly
 Hell Bent for Love (1934) - 'Trigger' Talano
 Name the Woman (1934) - Dave Evans
Once to Every Bachelor (1934) - District Attorney Jerry Landers
 Million Dollar Ransom (1934) - Easy
 Take the Stand (1934) - Ernie Paddock
 Against the Law (1934) - Mike Eagan
 Gentlemen Are Born (1934) - Al Ludlow
 One Hour Late (1934) - Jim (uncredited)
 The Best Man Wins (1935) - Silk (uncredited)
 Red Hot Tires (1935) - Curley Taylor
 Shadow of Doubt (1935) - Len Haworth
 The Nut Farm (1935) - Hamilton T. Holland - Acting School
 The Unwelcome Stranger (1935) - Lucky Palmer
 Baby Face Harrington (1935) - Dave
 Mister Dynamite (1935) - Felix
 The Texas Rambler (1935) - Cabin henchman (uncredited)
 Chinatown Squad (1935) - Claude Palmer
 Champagne for Breakfast (1935) - Wayne Osborne
 Cheers of the Crowd (1935) - Blake Walton
 The Public Menace (1935) - Louie
 Cappy Ricks Returns (1935) - Spencer Winton
 King Solomon of Broadway (1935) - Roth
 Forced Landing (1935) - Steven Greer
 Woman Trap (1936) - Harry Flint
 Three of a Kind (1936) - Rodney Randall
 The Princess Comes Across (1936) - The Stranger
 Two in a Crowd (1936) - Tony Bonelli
 Wedding Present (1936) - Givens (uncredited)
 Ellis Island (1936) - Solo
 Woman-Wise (1937) - Mac (uncredited)
 Don't Tell the Wife (1937) - Hagar - Salesman
 Trouble in Morocco (1937) - Branenok
 Her Husband Lies (1937) - 'Pug, ' Gunman
 The Outcasts of Poker Flat (1937) - Sonoma
 There Goes My Girl (1937) - Joe Rethburn - Nightclub Owner
 Fifty Roads to Town (1937) - Pinelli
 You Can't Beat Love (1937) - Dwight Parsons
 Super-Sleuth (1937) - Ralph Waring
 The Toast of New York (1937) - Vanderbilt Associate (uncredited)
 Hideaway (1937) - Al Miller
 Music for Madame (1937) - Rollins
 Crashing Hollywood (1938) - Thomas 'Tom' Darcy / 'The Hawk'
 Night Spot (1938) - Marty Davis
 Go Chase Yourself (1938) - Frank
 Crime Ring (1938) - Lionel Whitmore
 The Affairs of Annabel (1938) - Howard Webb
 Fugitives for a Night (1938) - Dennis Poole
 Annabel Takes a Tour (1938) - Howard Webb, Chief of Wonder Pictures
 The Law West of Tombstone (1938) - Doc Howard
 Twelve Crowded Hours (1939) - Tom Miller
 Fixer Dugan (1939) - A.J. Barvin, Circus Owner
 Cafe Hostess (1940) - Al
 Enemy Agent (1940) - Francis
 Girl from Havana (1940) - Cort
 Beyond the Sacramento (1940) - Cord Crowley aka Hank Bradley
 Scattergood Baines (1941) - McKettrick
 Footlight Fever (1941) - Harvey Parker (uncredited)
 The Big Store (1941) - Duke
 Scattergood Meets Broadway (1941) - H. C. Bard
 Badlands of Dakota (1941) - Jesse Chapman (uncredited)
 Roaring Frontiers (1941) - Hawk Hammond
 Mr. District Attorney in the Carter Case (1941) - Elliott Carter
 Freckles Comes Home (1942) - Nate Quigley
 The Bugle Sounds (1942) - Second Adjutant (uncredited)
 Top Sergeant (1942) - Tony Gribaldi
 Sons of the Pioneers (1942) - Frank Bennett
 Isle of Missing Men (1942) - George Kent
 King of the Mounties (1942, Serial) - Blake
 War Dogs (1942) - Judge Roger Davis
 The Traitor Within (1942) - Al McGonigle
 Silent Witness (1943) - District Attorney Robert Holden
 Sherlock Holmes in Washington (1943) - Cady
 What's Buzzin', Cousin? (1943) - Pete Hartley (uncredited)
 Find the Blackmailer (1943) - Mitch Farrell

References

External links

1901 births
1985 deaths
20th-century American male actors
American male film actors
Male actors from Seattle